The Ranongga white-eye or splendid white-eye (Zosterops splendidus) is a species of bird in the family Zosteropidae. It is endemic to the Solomon Islands.

Its natural habitat is subtropical or tropical moist lowland forests. It is threatened by habitat loss.

References

External links
BirdLife Species Factsheet

Ranongga white-eye
Birds of the Western Province (Solomon Islands)
Endemic fauna of the Solomon Islands
Ranongga white-eye
Taxonomy articles created by Polbot